Richard Claxton Gregory (October 12, 1932 – August 19, 2017) was an American comedian,  civil rights leader, business owner and  entrepreneur, and vegetarian activist. His writings were best sellers. Gregory became popular among the African-American communities in the southern United States with his "no-holds-barred" sets, poking fun at the bigotry and racism in the United States. In 1961 he became a staple in the comedy clubs, appeared on television, and released comedy record albums.

Gregory was at the forefront of political activism in the 1960s, when he protested the Vietnam War and racial injustice. He was arrested multiple times and went on many hunger strikes. He later became a speaker and author, primarily promoting spirituality. Gregory died of heart failure, aged 84, at a Washington, D.C., hospital in August 2017.

Early life 
Gregory was born in St. Louis, Missouri, the son of Lucille, a housemaid, and Presley Gregory. At Sumner High School, he was aided by teachers, among them Warren St. James; he also excelled at running, winning the state cross country championship in 1950. Gregory earned a track scholarship to Southern Illinois University (SIU), where he set school records as a half-miler and miler. He was a member of Alpha Phi Alpha fraternity. In 1954, his college career was interrupted for two years when he was drafted into the United States Army. At the urging of his commanding officer, who had taken notice of his penchant for joking, Gregory got his start in comedy in the Army, where he entered and won several talent shows. In 1956, Gregory briefly returned to SIU after his discharge, but dropped out because he felt that the university "didn't want me to study, they wanted me to run."

In the hopes of becoming a professional comedian, Gregory moved to Chicago, Illinois, where he became part of a new generation of black comedians that included Nipsey Russell, Bill Cosby, and Godfrey Cambridge, all of whom broke with the minstrel tradition that presented stereotypical black characters. Gregory drew on current events, especially racial issues, for much of his material: "Segregation is not all bad. Have you ever heard of a collision where the people in the back of the bus got hurt?"

Comedy career 

Gregory started helping his family with the gigs he started to get at a young age. He was always involved in sports and in social groups in high school. He enrolled in Southern Illinois University in 1951. He was named the university's outstanding student athlete of the year in 1953. The same year he left college when he was drafted into the United States Army, where he performed comedy shows hosted by the Army after encouragement by his Commanding Officer. In 1961, Gregory made his New York debut at The Blue Angel nightclub, also recording a live set there, "Dick Gregory at the Blue Angel" for his album East & West. He soon came back to Chicago and finally got his big break at the Playboy Club in Chicago, also in 1961, that was supposed to be one night and ended up being six weeks and earned him a spot in Time and a guest appearance on Jack Paar’s show and other night clubs shows, etc.
Gregory began his career as a comedian while serving in the military in the mid-1950s. He served in the Army for a year and a half at Fort Hood in Texas, Fort Lee in Virginia, and Fort Smith in Arkansas. He was drafted in 1954 while attending Southern Illinois University. After being discharged in 1956, he returned to the university but did not receive a degree. He moved to Chicago with a desire to perform comedy professionally.

In 1958, Gregory opened the Apex Club nightclub in Illinois. The club failed and landed Gregory in financial hardship. In 1959, Gregory landed a job as master of ceremonies at the Roberts Show Club.

While working for the United States Postal Service during the daytime, Gregory performed as a comedian in small, primarily black-patronized nightclubs. In an interview with The Huffington Post, Gregory described the history of black comics as limited: "Blacks could sing and dance in the white night clubs but weren't allowed to stand flat-footed and talk to white folks, which is what a comic does."

In 1961, Gregory was working at the black-owned Roberts Show Bar in Chicago when he was spotted by Hugh Hefner.

Gregory attributed the launch of his career to Hefner. Based on his performance at Roberts Show Bar, Hefner hired Gregory to work at the Chicago Playboy Club as a replacement for comedian "Professor" Irwin Corey.

Gregory's comedy occasioned controversy in some conservative white circles. The administration of the University of Tennessee, for instance, branded Gregory an "extreme racist" whose "appearance would be an outrage and an insult to many citizens of this state", and revoked his invitation by students to speak on campus. The students sued, with noted litigator William Kunstler as their counsel, and in Smith v. University of Tennessee, 300 F. Supp. 777 (E.D. Tenn. 1969), won an order from the court that the university's policy was "too broad and vague". The University of Tennessee then implemented an "open speaker" system, and Gregory subsequently performed in April 1970.

In 1964, Gregory's book, Nigger, was published. Since then, the book has never been out of print. In 2019 a trade paperback was published as well as an audio version.

Post-standup career 
Gregory was number 82 on Comedy Central's list of the 100 Greatest Stand-ups of all time and had his own star on the St. Louis Walk of Fame.

He was a co-host with radio personality Cathy Hughes, and was a frequent morning guest, on WOL 1450 AM talk radio's The Power, the flagship station of Hughes' Radio One. He also appeared regularly on the nationally syndicated Imus in the Morning program.

Gregory appeared as "Mr. Sun" on the television show Wonder Showzen (the third episode, entitled "Ocean", aired in 2005). As Chauncey, a puppet character, imbibes a hallucinogenic substance, Mr. Sun warns: "Don't get hooked on imagination, Chauncey. It can lead to terrible, horrible things." Gregory also provided guest commentary on the Wonder Showzen Season One DVD. Large segments of his commentary were intentionally bleeped out, including the names of several dairy companies, as he made potentially defamatory remarks concerning ill effects that the consumption of cow milk has on human beings.

Gregory attended and spoke at the funeral of James Brown on December 30, 2006, in Augusta, Georgia.

Gregory was an occasional guest on the Mark Thompson's Make It Plain Sirius Channel 146 Radio Show from 3pm to 6pm PST.

Gregory appeared on The Alex Jones Show on September 14, 2010, March 19, 2012, and April 1, 2014.

Gregory gave the keynote address for Black History Month at Bryn Mawr College on February 28, 2013.
His take-away message to the students was to never accept injustice.

Towards the end of his life, he was featured in a Fantagraphics book by Pat Thomas entitled Listen, Whitey: The Sights and Sounds of Black Power 1965–1975, which uses the political recordings of the Civil Rights era to highlight sociopolitical meanings throughout the movement.  Gregory is known for comedic performances that not only made people laugh, but mocked the establishment. According to Thomas, Gregory's monologues reflect a time when entertainment needed to be political to be relevant, which is why he included his standup in the collection. Gregory is featured along with the likes of Malcolm X, Huey P. Newton, Jesse Jackson, Martin Luther King Jr., Langston Hughes and Bill Cosby.

Political career 
Gregory began his political career by running against Richard J. Daley for Mayor of Chicago in 1967. Though he did not win, this would not prove to be the end of his participation in electoral politics.

Gregory ran for presidency in the 1968 United States presidential election as a write-in candidate of the Freedom and Peace Party, which had broken off from the Peace and Freedom Party. He garnered 47,097 votes, including one from Hunter S. Thompson, with fellow activist Mark Lane as his running mate in some states. His running mate in New Jersey was Dr. David Frost of Plainfield, a biologist, Rutgers professor, and Chairman of NJ SANE (Committee for a Sane Nuclear Policy). Famed pediatrician Dr. Benjamin Spock was the running mate in Virginia and Pennsylvania garnering more than the party he had left. The Freedom and Peace Party also ran other candidates, including Beulah Sanders for New York State Senate and Flora Brown for New York State Assembly. His efforts landed him on the master list of Nixon's political opponents.

Gregory then wrote the book Write Me In about his presidential campaign. One anecdote in the book relates the story of a publicity stunt that came out of Operation Breadbasket in Chicago. The campaign had printed one-dollar bills with Gregory's image on them, some of which made it into circulation. The majority of these bills were quickly seized by the federal government, much in part to the bills resembling authentic US currency enough to work in many dollar-cashing machines of the day. Gregory avoided being charged with a federal crime, later joking that the bills could not really be considered United States currency, because "everyone knows a black man will never be on a U.S. bill." On October 15, 1969, Gregory spoke at the Moratorium to End the War in Vietnam demonstration in Washington, D.C., where he joked to the crowd: "The President says nothing you kids do will have any effect on him. Well, I suggest he make one long-distance call to the LBJ ranch".

Political activism

Anti-Apartheid 
On July 21, 1979, Gregory appeared at the Amandla Festival where Bob Marley, Patti LaBelle, and Eddie Palmieri, among others, performed. Gregory gave a speech before Marley's performance, blaming President Jimmy Carter, and showing his support for the international Anti-Apartheid Movement.

Civil rights movement 

Gregory was active in the civil rights movement. On October 7, 1963, he came to Selma, Alabama, and spoke for two hours on a public platform two days before the voter registration drive known as "Freedom Day" (October 7, 1963).

In 1964, Gregory became more involved in civil rights activities, activism against the Vietnam War, economic reform, and anti-drug issues. As a part of his activism, he went on several hunger strikes and campaigns in America and overseas. In the early 1970s, he was banned from Australia, where government officials feared he would "...stir up demonstrations against the Vietnam war."

In 1964, Gregory played a role in the search for three missing civil rights workers, James Chaney, Andrew Goodman, and Michael Schwerner, who vanished in Philadelphia, Mississippi. After Gregory and members of CORE met with Neshoba County Sheriff Lawrence A. Rainey, Gregory became convinced that the Sheriff's office was complicit. With cash provided by Hugh Hefner, Gregory announced a $25,000 reward for information. The FBI, which had been criticized for inaction, eventually followed suit with its own reward, and the rewards worked. The bodies of the three men were found by the FBI 44 days after they disappeared.

At a civil rights rally marking the 40th anniversary of the Voting Rights Act of 1965, Gregory criticized the United States, calling it "the most dishonest, ungodly, unspiritual nation that ever existed in the history of the planet. As we talk now, America is 5 percent of the world's population and consumes 96 percent of the world's hard drugs".

Feminism 

Gregory was an outspoken feminist, and in 1978 joined Gloria Steinem, Betty Friedan, Bella Abzug, Margaret Heckler, Barbara Mikulski, and others to lead the National ERA March for Ratification and Extension, a march down Pennsylvania Avenue to the United States Capitol. Gregory was invited to join the march by actress and activist Susan Blakely. There were over 100,000 on Women's Equality Day (August 26), 1978, to demonstrate for a ratification deadline extension for the proposed Equal Rights Amendment to the United States Constitution, and for the ratification of the ERA.  The march was ultimately successful in extending the deadline to June 30, 1982, and Gregory joined other activists to the Senate for celebration and victory speeches by pro-ERA Senators, members of Congress, and activists. The ERA narrowly failed to be ratified by the extended ratification date.

JFK assassination and the Warren Commission 
Gregory became an outspoken critic of the findings of the Warren Commission concerning the assassination of John F. Kennedy by Lee Harvey Oswald. On February 3, 1975, in Washington, D.C., Gregory introduced photographic forensic investigator Stephen Jaffe and assassination researchers Robert J. Groden and Ralph Schoenman to the members and lawyers for the presidential commission known as the Rockefeller Commission who gave testimony and presented evidence. A month later, on March 6, 1975, Gregory and researcher Robert J. Groden appeared on Geraldo Rivera's late night ABC talk show Goodnight America. An important historical event happened that night when the famous Zapruder film of JFK's assassination was shown to the public on TV for the first time. The public's response and outrage to its showing led to the forming of the Hart-Schweiker investigation, which contributed to the Church Committee Investigation on Intelligence Activities by the United States, which resulted in the United States House Select Committee on Assassinations investigation.

Martin Luther King, Jr. 
Gregory and Mark Lane conducted landmark research into the assassination of Dr. Martin Luther King Jr., helping move the U.S. House Select Assassinations Committee to investigate the murder, along with that of John F. Kennedy. Lane was the author of conspiracy theory books such as Rush to Judgment. The pair wrote the King conspiracy book Code Name Zorro, which postulated that convicted assassin James Earl Ray did not act alone. Gregory also argued that the moon landing was faked and the commonly accepted account of the 9/11 attacks is incorrect, among other conspiracy theories.

In 1998, Gregory spoke at the celebration of the birthday of Dr Martin Luther King Jr., with President Bill Clinton in attendance. Not long after, the President told Gregory's long-time friend and public relations consultant Steve Jaffe, "I love Dick Gregory; he is one of the funniest people on the planet." They spoke of how Gregory had made a comment on Dr. King's birthday that broke everyone into laughter when he noted that the President made Speaker Newt Gingrich ride "in the back of the plane," on an Air Force One trip overseas.

Native American rights 
In 1966, Gregory and his wife were arrested for illegal net fishing alongside of the Nisqually people in Washington state in a protest fish-in. The tribe was protesting against the state laws that ban forms of fishing other than hook-and-line because it barred their rights guaranteed to them through a federal treaty that allowed them to fish in their traditional ways. He was later released from jail in Olympia, Washington after six weeks of fasting to call attention to the violation of Native American treaties by the United States government.

US Embassy hostage crisis in Iran 
Gregory was an outspoken activist during the US Embassy hostage crisis in Iran. In 1980, he traveled to Tehran to attempt to negotiate the hostages' release and engaged in a public hunger strike there, weighing less than 100 pounds (45 kg) when he returned to the United States.

Vegetarianism and animal rights 
Gregory became a vegetarian and fasting activist in 1965 "based on the philosophy of nonviolence practiced during the Civil Rights Movement." His 1973 book, Dick Gregory's Natural Diet For Folks Who Eat: Cookin' With Mother Nature, outlined how fasting and going vegetarian led to dramatic weight loss. He developed a diet drink called Bahamian Diet Nutritional Drink and went on TV shows to advocate his diet to help the morbidly obese. He wrote the introduction to Viktoras Kulvinskas' book Survival into the 21st Century. A talk he gave at Amherst College in 1986 inspired Tracye McQuirter to become a vegan activist.

In 1984, he founded Health Enterprises, Inc., a company that distributed weight-loss products. With this company, Gregory made efforts to improve the life expectancy of African Americans, which he believed was being hindered by poor nutrition and drug and alcohol abuse. In 1985, Gregory introduced the Slim-Safe Bahamian Diet, a powdered diet mix. He launched the weight-loss powder at the Whole Life Expo in Boston under the slogan "It's cool to be healthy." The diet mix, if drunk three times a day, was said to provide rapid weight loss. Gregory received a multimillion-dollar distribution contract to retail the diet.

In 1985, the Ethiopian government adopted, to reported success, Gregory's formula to combat malnutrition during a period of famine in the country. Gregory's clients included Muhammad Ali.

In 2003, Gregory and Cornel West wrote letters on behalf of People for the Ethical Treatment of Animals (PETA) to Kentucky Fried Chicken's CEO, asking that the company improve its animal-handling procedures.

Gregory saw civil rights and animal rights as intrinsically linked, once stating, "Because I'm a civil rights activist, I am also an animal rights activist. Animals and humans suffer and die alike. Violence causes the same pain, the same spilling of blood, the same stench of death, the same arrogant, cruel and vicious taking of life. We shouldn't be a part of it."

Personal life 
Gregory met his future wife Lillian Gregory at an African-American club; they married in 1959. They had 11 children (including one son, Richard Jr., who died two months after birth):  Michele, Lynne, Pamela, Paula, Xenobia 
(Stephanie), Gregory, Christian, Miss, Ayanna, and Yohance. In a 2000 interview with The Boston Globe, Gregory was quoted as saying, "People ask me about being a father and not being there. I say, 'Jack the Ripper had a father. Hitler had a father. Don't talk to me about family.'"

Health and death 
Gregory was diagnosed with lymphoma in late 1999. He said he was treating the cancer with herbs, vitamins, and exercise, which he believed kept the cancer in remission.

Gregory died from heart failure at a hospital in Washington, D.C., on August 19, 2017, at the age of 84. A week prior to his death, he was hospitalized with a bacterial infection.

Discography
 In Living Black and White (1961)
 East & West (1961)
 Dick Gregory Talks Turkey (1962)
 The Two Sides of Dick Gregory (1963)
 My Brother's Keeper (1963)
 Dick Gregory Running for President (1964)
 So You See... We All Have Problems (1964)
 Dick Gregory On: (1969)
 The Light Side: The Dark Side (1969)
 Dick Gregory's Frankenstein (1970)
 Live at the Village Gate (1970)
 At Kent State (1971)
 Caught in the Act (1974)
 The Best of Dick Gregory (1997)
 21st Century "State of the Union" (2001)
 You Don't Know Dick (2016)

Bibliography
 Nigger: An Autobiography by Dick Gregory, an autobiography written with Robert Lipsyte, E. P. Dutton, September 1964 (reprinted, Pocket Books, 1965–present)
 Write me in!, Bantam, 1968.
 From the Back of the Bus
 What's Happening?
 The Shadow that Scares Me
 Dick Gregory's Bible Tales, with Commentary, a book of Bible-based humor. 
 Dick Gregory's Natural Diet for Folks Who Eat: Cookin' With Mother Nature!. 
 (with Shelia P. Moses), Callus on My Soul: A Memoir. 
 Up from Nigger
 No More Lies; The Myth and the Reality of American History
 Dick Gregory's Political Primer
 (with Mark Lane), Murder in Memphis: The FBI and the Assassination of Martin Luther King
 (with Mel Watkins), African American Humor: The Best Black Comedy from Slavery to Today (Library of Black America)
 Robert Lee Green, Dick Gregory, daring Black leader
 African American Humor: The Best Black Comedy from Slavery to Today (editor). 
 "Not Poor, Just Broke", short story
 "Defining Moments in Black History: Reading Between the Lies", 2017.

Filmography
 The One and Only Dick Gregory (2021)
 The Leisure Seeker (2017)
 The History of Comedy (2017)
 Ir/Reconcilable (2014)
 Steppin: The Movie (2009) 
 One Bright Shining Moment (2006)
 Wonder Showzen (2005)
 Reno 911! (2004)
 The Hot Chick (2002), as Bathroom Attendant
 Children of the Struggle (1999), as Vernon Lee
 Panther (1995), as Rev. Slocum
 The Glass Shield (1994)
 ABC Stage 67 (TV Series) (1967), as Civil Rights Marcher
 Sweet Love, Bitter (1967), as Richie 'Eagle' Stokes

Cultural references

Joe Morton played Dick Gregory in 2016 in the play Turn Me Loose at the Westside Theatre in Manhattan.

The American hip-hop duo Run the Jewels included a reference to Gregory's theories in the song "Walking in the Snow" on their album RTJ4, released in 2020. The song was first performed live in an event by Adult Swim coinciding with the lead-up to the 2020 United States Presidential election, broadcast on October 17, 2020. The excerpted lyrics are:
"Dick Gregory told me a couple of secrets before he laid down in his grave
All of us serve the same masters, All of us nothin' but slaves
Never forget in the story of Jesus, the hero was killed by the state."

A documentary film about the life of Dick Gregory entitled The One and Only Dick Gregory written and directed by Andre Gaines made its world premiere at the Tribeca Film Festival on June 19, 2021, and was released on Showtime television on July 4, 2021. The film was heralded by critics and rated Certified Fresh on Rotten Tomatoes with a 100% critics' score.

See also

 Timeline of the civil rights movement
 Gregory v. City of Chicago
 List of peace activists
 List of civil rights leaders

References

External links

 
 SNCC Digital Gateway: Dick Gregory, Documentary website created by the SNCC Legacy Project and Duke University, telling the story of the Student Nonviolent Coordinating Committee and grassroots organizing from the inside-out
 
 
 
 A short biography from www.dickgregory.com
 
 Dick Gregory's oral history video excerpts at The National Visionary Leadership Project
 

 
1932 births
2017 deaths
20th-century American comedians
20th-century American male actors
20th-century American politicians
20th-century American non-fiction writers
20th-century American male writers
21st-century American comedians
21st-century American male actors
9/11 conspiracy theorists
Activists for African-American civil rights
African-American feminists
African-American stand-up comedians
African-American candidates for President of the United States
American animal rights activists
American anti–Vietnam War activists
American autobiographers
American conspiracy theorists
American feminists
American male comedians
American male middle-distance runners
American male non-fiction writers
American political writers
American religious skeptics
American social commentators
American stand-up comedians
American vegetarianism activists
Colpix Records artists
Free speech activists
John F. Kennedy conspiracy theorists
Male feminists
Military personnel from Missouri
Native Americans' rights activists
Peace and Freedom Party politicians
Southern Illinois Salukis athletes
Sumner High School (St. Louis) alumni
United States Army soldiers
Urban One
Vee-Jay Records artists
Writers from St. Louis